Sigavé (also Singave or Sigave) is one of the three official chiefdoms of the French territory of Wallis and Futuna in Oceania in the South Pacific Ocean. (The other two chiefdoms are Uvea and Alo.)

Geography

Overview
Sigave encompasses the western third of Futuna Island (30 km2 of Futuna Island's total area of 83 km2). Sigave has six villages, which together had a population of 1,275 as of the 2018 census. The capital and largest village is Leava (pop. 322).

Administrative division
The chiefdom of Sigave is coextensive with the district of the same name. Its six villages (or municipalities) are as follows:

History

Education

The junior high school in the area is Collège Fiua de Sigave.

See also
 Hoorn Islands
 List of kings of Sigave

References

External links

 Area figures
 Map: Lonely Planet
 Map: Everyculture
 

Chiefdoms and districts of Wallis and Futuna
Kingdoms
Island countries